KLWY (channel 27) is a television station in Cheyenne, Wyoming, United States, affiliated with the Fox and Me-TV networks. The station is owned by Coastal Television, and maintains a transmitter southwest of Cheyenne along I-25.

KLWY is a semi-satellite of KFNB (channel 20) and KWYF-LD (channel 20), the Fox and Me-TV affiliates in Casper; the two stations air nearly the same programming with separate station identifications and commercials, and KLWY is operated from KFNB's studios on Skyview Drive in Casper.

History
KLWY signed on August 5, 1994, as the third full-fledged commercial station in eastern Wyoming following KGWN-TV in 1954 and KQCK in 1987. It immediately joined Fox; previously, Denver's KDVR was carried by some cable providers in southeastern Wyoming, but much of the eastern portion of the state did not receive Fox programming at all as this was one of the few areas of the country where cable was not yet readily available. It took 13 years for KLWY to launch; the construction permit had been issued August 4, 1981, to the Chrysostom Corporation, which owned Casper's KCWY-TV (channel 14). It then was sold in 1983 to Heart of Wyoming Television, which was the original owner of Casper's channel 20 (when it was KXWY-TV). Wyomedia, which became the owner of the Casper station in the early 1990s, then acquired KLWY in 1992.

KLWY carried a secondary affiliation with UPN until the network closed in September 2006.

Until 2004, KLWY's programming was simulcast on K26ES in Casper and K11RN in Douglas. Wyomedia converted these two stations into full-time UPN affiliates in 2004, then to CW affiliates after UPN's closure. K26ES is now KWYF-LD, an affiliate of MyNetworkTV and MeTV; its programming is simulcast in Cheyenne on the third subchannel of KLWY.

KLWY made the switch to digital on February 17, 2009.

The station does not have a website. KLWY does not air its own newscasts per se, however it collaborates with NewsNet for a 9 p.m. local broadcast; the only other newscast on the station is a rebroadcast of Good Morning Wyoming from KTWO-TV in Casper. However, KTWO's programming, including ABC programming and its newscasts, are simulcast on a digital subchannel of KLWY.

Wyomedia Corporation agreed to sell its stations to Legacy Broadcasting on February 8, 2018; the sale was canceled on October 2, 2018. On October 8, 2019, Wyomedia announced that it would sell its stations to Front Range Television, a subsidiary of Coastal Television Broadcasting Company (run by Bill Fielder); the sale was concurrent with Vision Alaska's purchase of KKTQ-LD (channel 16). Coastal Television and Vision Alaska (run by Stephen Brissette) already jointly operated stations in Alaska. The sale was completed on June 1, 2020.

Technical information

Subchannels
The station's digital signal is multiplexed:

KLWY originally signed on a digital signal at channel 28, and took part of the mandatory digital conversion on February 18, 2009, where it flash cut its analog signal. After the transition, KLWY returned to its position on channel 27, where it remains today. The station was quick to add KTWO as KKTQ, after KDEV-LP lost ABC affiliation, and MeTV came shortly afterwards. In 2019, KLWY signed on its fourth subchannel as Ion Television; followed by the fifth subchannel in January 2021 as Cozi TVl and two additional subchannels (TrueReal and Defy TV) in July 2021, bringing the total up to seven, the highest in Wyoming.

Translator

References

External links

LWY
Fox network affiliates
Cozi TV affiliates
TrueReal affiliates
Defy TV affiliates
Television channels and stations established in 1994
1994 establishments in Wyoming